Arya Penangsang was king of the Sultanate of Demak , 1549–1554.

History of Java
Javanese monarchs
16th-century Indonesian people